Pritchard is a surname of Cornish and Welsh origin. It is an anglicisation of the name ap Rhisiart, literally son of Richard. At the time of the British Census of 1881, its frequency was highest on Anglesey (over 30 times the national average), followed by Caernarfonshire, Brecknockshire, Herefordshire, Radnorshire, Denbighshire, Monmouthshire, Flintshire, Merioneth and Shropshire. The name Pritchard may refer to:

People
Ada Pritchard (1898–1993), Canadian politician
AJ Pritchard, English professional dancer
Albert Richard Pritchard (1863–1927), American businessman
Alex Pritchard (born 1993), English footballer
Alexander Pritchard (1825–1898), Australian politician
Alexis Pritchard (born 1983), South-African-born New Zealand boxer
Alf Pritchard (1920–1995), English footballer
Alwynne Pritchard (born 1968), British composer
Andrew Pritchard  (1804–1882) an English microscopist
Anthony Pritchard, Australian administrator
Arthur Pritchard (1917–2005), Welsh footballer
Benjamin D. Pritchard (1835–1907), American soldier
Bianca Langham-Pritchard (born 1975), Australian field hockey player
Bill Pritchard, English singer songwriter
Bosh Pritchard (1919–1996), American football player 
Bradley Pritchard (born 1985), Zimbabwean footballer
Buddy Pritchard (born 1936), American baseball player and manager
Catrin Pritchard, British cancer researcher
Cecil Pritchard (1902–1966), international rugby union hooker
Charles Pritchard (1808–1893), British astronomer
Charlie Pritchard (1882–1916). Welsh international rugby player
Chris Pritchard (born 1968), American murderer
Chris Pritchard (cyclist) (born 1983), Scottish Cyclist
Cliff Pritchard (1881–1954), Welsh international rugby player
Curtis Pritchard (born 1996), English dancer and choreographer
Dalton Pritchard Color TV pioneer
Darrin Pritchard (born 1966), Australian footballer
David Pritchard (disambiguation)
Deborah Pritchard (born 1977), British composer
Dylan Pritchard, American soccer player
E. E. Evans-Pritchard (1902–1973), English anthropologist
Earl A. Pritchard (1884–?), American college sports coach
Earl H. Pritchard (1907–1995), American sinologist
Edward Pritchard (disambiguation), several people
Edward William Pritchard (1825–1865), English doctor and murderer
Edwin Pritchard (1889–1976), American track and field athlete
Elaine Pritchard (1926–2012), English chess master
Esther Tuttle Pritchard (1840–1900), American minister, editor
Ethel Pritchard (1880–1964), New Zealand military and civilian nurse
Forrest Pritchard (born 1974), author and farmer
Frank Pritchard (born 1983), Australian rugby league player
Geoff Pritchard (born 1966), Australian rules footballer
George Pritchard (missionary) (1796–1883), British missionary
George H. Pritchard (football coach), American football coach
George M. Pritchard (1886–1955), American lawyer and politician
Graham Pritchard (born 1942), English cricketer
Gwynedd Pritchard (1924–2012)
Hannah Pritchard (1711–1768), English actress
Harold Arthur Prichard (1871–1947), British philosopher
Harry Pritchard (1871–1953), rear admiral in the Royal Navy
Hazel Pritchard (1913–1967), Australian cricketer
Herman Pritchard (1883 – after 1942), American football player and coach
Hilary Pritchard (1942–1996), a Manx film and television actress
Howard Pritchard (born 1948), British footballer
Hugh Pritchard, biathlon athlete for Great Britain at the 2002 Winter Olympics
Huw O. Pritchard, Canadian chemist
J. E. M. Pritchard (1889–1921) British aviator
J. W. Pritchard (born 1903), Indian civil servant
Jack Pritchard (1899–1992), British furniture designer
Jack Pritchard (footballer) (1918–2000), English footballer
James Pritchard (disambiguation), several people
Janine Pritchard, Supreme Court justice, Western Australia
Jeter Connelly Pritchard (1857–1921), American politician
Jim Pritchard (1948–2014), Canadian ice hockey player
Joe Pritchard, American football coach
Joel Pritchard (1925–1977), American politician
John Pritchard (disambiguation), several people
Jonathan K. Pritchard, English-born professor of genetics
Josh Pritchard (born 1992), Welsh footballer
Katharine Susannah Prichard, Australian author and co-founding member of the Communist Party of Australia
Kathleen I. Pritchard, Canadian oncologist
Kathryn Pritchard, British figure skating partner of Jason Briggs
Kaysa Pritchard (born 1994), Australian Rugby League player
Kevin Pritchard (born 1967), American basketball player
Lauren Pritchard (disambiguation)
Lex Pritchard (born 1954), Australian rules footballer
Linda Pritchard (born 1983), Swedish singer and dancer
Luke Pritchard (born 1985), British musician
Margaret Pritchard, Welsh radio and television broadcaster
Marian Pritchard (1869–1945), early fashion journalist and author
Marion Pritchard (1920–2016), Dutch-American social worker
Mark Pritchard (disambiguation), multiple people
Martin Pritchard (born 1959), Australian politician
Mathew Pritchard (born 1973), Welsh skateboarder and celebrity chef
Matthew Pritchard (1669–1750), Roman Catholic bishop
Melissa Pritchard, American author and journalist
Michael Pritchard (born 1972), American musician
Mike Pritchard (born 1969), American football player
Norman Pritchard (1875–1929), Anglo-Indian athlete and actor
Paul Pritchard (born 1967), British climber
Payton Pritchard (born 1998), American basketball player
Peter Pritchard (1943–2020), zoologist
Phil Pritchard (ice hockey), Canadian hockey administrator
Robert W. Pritchard, American politician
Ron Pritchard (born 1947), American football player
Ross Pritchard (1924–2020), American academic administrator
Russell Pritchard (born 1979), British musician
Sara B. Pritchard (born 1972), American historian of technology and environmental historian
Tavita Pritchard (born 1987), American football coach
Thomas Farnolls Pritchard (c. 1723 – 1777), English architect
Tom Pritchard (1917–2017), New Zealand cricketer
Urban Pritchard (1845–1925), British otologist
Wendy Pritchard (born 1949), Australian hockey player
Wesley Pritchard, American singer
William Pritchard (1901–1978), American football coach
William Arthur "Bill" Pritchard (1888–1981), Canadian socialist politician and publisher
William H. Pritchard (born 1932), American academic and literary critic

See also
Prichard (disambiguation)
Pritchard (disambiguation)

References 

Surnames of Welsh origin
Anglicised Welsh-language surnames
English-language surnames
Cornish-language surnames
Patronymic surnames
Surnames from given names